We've Got a Fuzzbox and We're Gonna Use It!!, often shortened to Fuzzbox, are a British alternative rock group. Formed in Birmingham in 1985, the all-female then quartet originally consisted of Vix (Vickie Perks), Magz (Maggie Dunne), Jo Dunne and Tina O'Neill. The band's name was shortened to Fuzzbox for the U.S. release of their first album. They disbanded in 1990 after releasing two studio albums, and reunited in 2010 for a series of concerts. A second reunion was confirmed in 2015.

Biography
Resident in Moseley, Sheldon and Acocks Green, Birmingham, Fuzzbox came together in 1985. Their name was chosen after they bought a distortion pedal for their guitars and Maggie Dunne stated "We've got a fuzzbox and we're gonna use it!".

Their first release, in March 1986, was a single of "XX Sex" and "Rules and Regulations", with the fuzzbox featuring prominently, which reached No. 41 in the UK charts. This proved a huge success for the group: while not reaching the Top 40, the Vindaloo Records release remained in the Indie chart for 25 weeks. This led to tours of the UK and Europe and, in December that year, their debut album, Bostin' Steve Austin, was released (Geffen re-titled the album We've Got a Fuzzbox and We're Gonna Use It upon its US release).  This album spawned the band's first Top 40 hit, "Love Is The Slug", and the minor hit "What's The Point".

In the summer of 1986 the band teamed up with their Vindaloo Records labelmates The Nightingales and Ted Chippington to record a single "Rocking with Rita (Head to Toe)". The single, credited to the Vindaloo Summer Special, featured Fuzzbox tackling such classics as "Itsy Bitsy Teenie Weenie Yellow Polka Dot Bikini" on the b-side. Further discussions led to their cover of Norman Greenbaum's hit "Spirit in the Sky", with vocals provided by Magz (Maggie).

The band signed to WEA and, for their next album, Big Bang! (1989), made an abrupt change and reinvented themselves as a slick dance-pop vocal group. The songs "Pink Sunshine", "Fast Forward Futurama" and "International Rescue" were all produced by Andy Richards and co-written by Liam Sternberg. The first three singles from the album, "International Rescue" (UK No. 11), "Pink Sunshine" (UK No. 14) and "Self!" (UK No. 24), all reached the UK Top 30, and a fourth single released from the album, a cover of Yoko Ono's "Walking on Thin Ice", peaked at No. 76. "Self!" also became the group's only charting single in the United States when it peaked at number 16 on the Billboard Modern Rock chart and number 35 on Billboards Dance Music Club Play chart.

In 1990, they began work on a new album entitled Out Of This World, but the project was halted after the release of the first single "Your Loss, My Gain" due to 'musical differences'. Perks decided to continue a solo career under the name of Vix, whilst the other three members left the music industry. They reunited in 2008 and appeared at the Birmingham Pride festival. Previously unreleased material was issued as Fuzz and Nonsense and From Rules and Regulations to Pink Sunshine, featuring tracks originally slated for Out Of This World. An album was later released of their two radio sessions for the late John Peel and sessions for Janice Long's show, entitled Love Is a Slug: Complete BBC Sessions. Peel-show listeners voted "Rules and Regulations" number 31 in the Festive Fifty in 1986.

In October 2004 a compilation of Fuzzbox singles and alternative mixes entitled Look At The Hits On That was released, complete with a DVD of their promotional videos – most of which were publicly unavailable until that release.

Television appearances
T.V. appearances by the group include MTV, Going Live, Jim'll Fix It, The Old Grey Whistle Test, and eight performances on Top of the Pops. Fuzzbox performed "Pink Sunshine" on Ghost Train on a sunny Saturday morning in 1989, halfway through their performance their backing tape rewound and started again.

Reunion
Early in 2010, Fuzzbox announced their reunion, returning as a quintet without drummer Tina O'Neill. A 13-date UK tour took place in May, along with a new single and video, a cover of M's "Pop Muzik", released through Gotham Records and iTunes on 17 May.

On 25 September 2010, Fuzzbox headlined at the Shifnal Festival; on 25 March 2011, they played at the Whitby Gothic Weekend. The latter was this reunion's last gig, the project disbanding shortly afterwards.

Guitarist Jo Dunne died on 26 October 2012, six weeks after being diagnosed with cancer. She was 43.

Second reunion
In July 2015, Fuzzbox appeared on BBC Radio 2 with Sara Cox to confirm a second reunion. On 9 September, it was confirmed that Megan Burke, Sarit Black and Hannah Layhe had joined the band on guitar, bass and drums respectively. On 13 November 2015 the new lineup played a comeback gig at The 100 Club in London. In 2016, they announced the release of a new single and video, 'Let's Go Supernova!', and a UK tour in December with The Wonder Stuff.

In March 2022, the band announced the release of We’ve Got A Fuzzbox and We’re Going To Use It – Reimagined/Reimagined Too: The Best of Fuzzbox Reimagined, and album of re-recorded and reworked material from their back catalogue featuring guest spots from soul singer Melanie Williams and Happy Monday's official tour DJ Vince Vega.

Solo work
Fuzzbox lead singer Vix joined Ginger of the Wildhearts' supergroup Ginger & The Sonic Circus along with guitarist/ producer Jason Edwards (Wolfsbane), Jon Poole (The Wildhearts/Cardiacs) and Conny Bloom (Hanoi Rocks). They headlined the Gibson/MySpace stage at the 2006 Download festival and did several dates in the U.S and Japan as well as a couple of UK tours before The Wildhearts eventually reformed, putting further plans on hold.

Vix also released an 11 track album in 2008, LovePower and Peace on Damage Control Music. The album features nine original tracks along with re-workings of two Fuzzbox songs, "Your Loss, My Gain" and "You", and was co-written and produced by Robin George.

Vix recorded a further EP called "Seduction Songs" on Fierce Kitten Records with Robin George, Pete Haycock (Climax Blues Band), Mark Sheppard (the Offering), Mel Collins (Bryan Ferry/ King Crimson/ Meat Loaf), Jacquie Williams (Sister Sledge), Joy Shannon (Joy Shannon and the Beauty Marks, The Birmingham Women in Music and the LovePower & Peace Kids Choir in 2013).

Vix released a gospel-tinged pop single called "Believe Me" with the Offering in 2014.

ViX n The Kix/Vix & Her MsChiefsViX n The Kix''' was a musical project initiated in 2007 by Vix. Ruckus magazine described ViX n The Kix's music as "a retro lashing of slick Fifties glamour and flirty burlesque...alternates between fun, punk-inspired blasts of guitar-powered pop to lush, emotive ballads – influences taking in everything from No Doubt through Garbage to Roxy Music and The Pretenders." The project ended when Vix announced the reunion of Fuzzbox in 2010.

In late 2011, following the end of the first Fuzzbox reunion, Vix – temporarily reverting to her real name, Victoria Perks – announced the formation of her new Americana / New Country project, The Victoria Perks Band.

In 2014, she formed her current all-girl Americana band called ViX & her MsChiefs, releasing an EP.

Band members
Current
 Vix – vocalist (1985–present). Born Victoria Perks, 9 October 1968, Birmingham.
 Maggie Dunne – keyboard, bass (1985–present). Born 5 June 1964, Solihull.
 Megan Burke – guitar (2015–present).
 Sarit Black – bass (2015–present).
 Hannah Layhe – drums (2015–present).

Former
 Jo Dunne – guitar (1985–1990, 2010-2011). Born 12 November 1968, Birmingham; died 26 October 2012.
 Tina O'Neill – drums (1985–1990).Larkin, Colin (1992) The Guinness Who's Who of Indie and New Wave Music, Guinness Publishing, pp. 309/310,   Born 20 January 1969, Birmingham.
 Sarah Firebrand – bass (2010–2011).
 Karen Milne - drums (2010–2011).

Discography
Albums
 Bostin' Steve Austin (1986), Vindaloo Records1
 Big Bang! (1989), Warner Bros. - UK No. 5
 We’ve Got a Fuzzbox and We’re Going to Use It – Reimagined/Reimagined Too: The Best of Fuzzbox Reimagined (2022), Pagster Music Via Gonzo Media2

1 Bostin' Steve Austin was released as We've Got a Fuzzbox and We're Gonna Use It in the US by Geffen Records in 1987.
2 An album of re-recorded songs from Fuzzbox's back catalogue

Compilations
 Fuzz and Nonsense (2000), Cherry Red
 Rules & Regulations to Pink Sunshine: Fuzzbox Story (2001), Cherry Red
 Look at the Hits on That (2004), WSM
 Love Is a Slug: Complete BBC Sessions (2005), Cherry Red

Singles and EPs

1 Rules and Regulations'' also peaked at number 1 on UK Indie Chart
2 "What's the Point" contains a cover of Queen's "Bohemian Rhapsody"
3 "Your Loss My Gain" (limited release)

References

External links
Fuzzbox official Facebook page
[ Fuzzbox biography at the AMG website]
Vix Perks official website
Video interview with Jo, Vix and Maggie
Fuzzbox music video playlist

All-female punk bands
Musical groups from Birmingham, West Midlands
Musical groups established in 1985
Musical groups disestablished in 1990
English alternative rock groups
English pop punk groups
Musical groups reestablished in 2010
Musical groups disestablished in 2011
Musical groups reestablished in 2015
British rock girl groups
English girl groups
1985 establishments in England
Geffen Records artists
Warner Records artists
Cherry Red Records artists